Joseph R. McLerran, better known as Little Joe McLerran, (born July 16, 1983) is an American blues singer and guitarist. In 2009, representing the Blues Society of Tulsa, Little Joe won the International Blues Challenge Solo/Duo competition hosted by the Blues Foundation and held each year in Memphis. In 2010 Little Joe teamed up with Jazz at Lincoln Center and joined the Rhythm Road taking a quartet featuring David Bernston on harmonica, Robbie Mack on bass and drummer Ron McRorey on a tour of the Middle East visiting Bahrain, Saudi Arabia, Kuwait and Oman just weeks before the onset of the Arab Spring later that same year.

History
Little Joe McLerran was born in Boulder, Colorado. Joe started playing the guitar and studying the Piedmont Blues style the age of 8  and by the age of 10 he was busking on Boulder's fabled Pearl Street Mall with his younger brother Jesse on drums. They played blues songs from the masters; Big Bill Broonzy, Skip James, Tampa Red, Mississippi John Hurt and many others. The McLerran family moved to Tulsa in 1998 where Joe and Jesse continued to play old blues songs.

In 2004, during the final stages of mixing the CD Jesse died due to an accident at home. As a memorial and tribute to Jesse, the Pearly Gates CD was released in 2004 as Son Piedmont and the Blues Krewe on the Roots Blues Reborn label.

In 2009, Little Joe took first place at the International Blues Challenge held each year in Memphis, Tennessee by the Blues Foundation. Little Joe was representing the Blues Society of Tulsa.
In 2010 Little Joe was selected by Jazz at Lincoln Center and the US State Department to take part in the Rhythm Road: American Music Abroad, a U.S. State Department cultural exchange program. In early 2010, Little Joe traveled to the Persian Gulf region of the Middle East with his band, the Little Joe McLerran Quartet.  The band visited Bahrain then crossed the causeway to Saudi Arabia where they made history performing the first public concert ever held there in that nation's history.  Public concerts, school workshops and concerts and private diplomatic parties at the embassies and consulates across the nation. The band then traveled to Kuwait and finished the 5-week tour in Muscat, Oman with a concert at the Crown Plaza Hotel. The tour ended just weeks before the onset of the Arab Spring as it began that year in Tunisia and Bahrain.

Little Joe continues to travel for the State Department as a musical ambassador presenting educational and cultural exchange missions to the masses.  On behalf of the Department of State he took his trio to the South American embassies in the countries of Paraguay in 2011 and Colombia in 2012.  He took the band to the Dominican Republic in 2014.

In 2013, McLerran was inducted into the Oklahoma Jazz Hall of Fame and presented with the Legacy Tribute Award.

Little Joe continues to perform at festivals, concerts and clubs across the country and around the world as a solo act and with his band.

Discography
2004 - Son Piedmont and the Blues Krewe - RBR Records
2006 - The Hard Way - Hit Records
2007 - Live at Last Volume 1 - RBR Records
2009 - Believe I'll Make a Change - RBR Records
2012 - Facebook Blues - RBR Records
2018 - Little Joe McLerran and Flávio Guimarães - Blue Crawfish Records

2018 - Little Joe McLerran and Flávio Guimarães - Month of Sundays - Blue Crawfish Records

Personal life
Little Joe has two children; Josephine and John Lee.

References

External links
Official website

Living people
1983 births
American blues singers
American blues guitarists
Musicians from Boulder, Colorado
21st-century American singers
21st-century American guitarists

www.littlejoemclerran.com